David Robilliard (1952–1988) was a British poet and contemporary artist.

Life
David Robilliard was born in 1952 in Guernsey. He moved to London in 1975, accompanying his friend Lester Queripel, hoping to launch his career as a musician and a poet. Robilliard did not have any formal training as a painter, but he had started writing poetry and making drawings in Guernsey. However, there are no traces of these early poems and drawings: according to Lester Queripel in a letter to Gilbert & George dated 12 November 1988, he consistently destroyed his work as he did not want to be called a "sissy" by his friends. In London, he lived in the Shoreditch area, and shared a studio with Andrew Heard from 1983 onwards. The artist was also his partner. He frequented the London club and pub scene, a familiar presence in places such as Blitz, where Andrew Heard worked in the 1970s, Heaven and the Café de Paris, The Bell in King's Cross and the French House in Soho.

Career
David Robilliard met Gilbert & George around 1979, and became one of their models; he was charged with finding models for them in Soho, as well as the east and west ends. He featured as in the film The World of Gilbert and George in 1981, repeatedly stating the phrase "I am angry"; his character is described as a "Shot Youth" in the storyboard of the film.

David Robilliard pursued his career in poetry during his early years in London. His work was supported by Gilbert & George who also encouraged Robilliard to associate images to his written work. They published his first poetry volume, Inevitable, in 1984. His first exhibition of drawings in the same year, at the Stephen Bartley Gallery, was originally only meant as a backdrop to the book's launch. Stephen Bartley describes the way the exhibition developed: "the exhibition was conceived at short notice in collaboration with Andrew Heard, most of the drawings (other than those used in the books) were done in the two weeks before the show. I suggested that David and Andrew hire a few frames so that the drawings could be hung as a backdrop to the party. I was amazed when they produced some 40 pieces and mounted a professional show. Everything was priced at £75, no catalogue was produced because we were concentrating on the book. One sale to Anthony d'Offay resulted. (...) The exhibition was taken down the day after as the frames had to be returned." On the invitation card for the exhibition, Gilbert & George described Robilliard as "the new master of the modern person. Looking, thinking, feeling, seeing, bitching – he brilliantly encapsulates the 'Existers' spirit of our time."

His drawings were also exhibited at l'Escargot, where the first public reading of his poetry took place, performed by Stephen Chamberlain. David Robilliard did not want to perform his own poetry live; instead, he recruited people to perform his poetry for him. This included artists such as Leo Burley, who relates his experience in "Memory of a Friend".

From 1984 onwards, almost all of the 58 paintings he produced between 1987 and 1988 were portraits. They are portraits of anonymous people he observed as well as acquaintances and fellow artists such as Andrew Heard, Gilbert & George and Duggie Fields.

His second volume of poetry, Swallowing Helmets, was published in 1987. Through 1987, Robilliard distributed shorter poems on postcards that were then sent through the post to a small mailing list. The poems were printed on an old letterpress by the art dealer Paul Conran. They distributed a poem card through the post each month in 1987. In December 1987, the twelve poems cards were reprinted by Birch & Conran as A Box of Poems in an edition of 100 copies; the first 30 copies contained a live cassette recording of Robilliard reading each poem. Birch & Conran also posthumously published poem cards for August to December 1988. His poem cards were also produced by Gilbert & George, Hercules Fisherman, Judy Adam and Lorcan O' Neill. He also wrote books and published articles in The Fred, Square Peg and The Manipulator.

His artwork was exhibited at the L'Escargot, a restaurant in Soho, and the Hippodrome, a music venue on Charing Cross. His work was shown in a post-humous exhibition in 1990, at the Hirsch & Adler Modern gallery in New York. It was also included within the group exhibition The British Art Show 1990 at the South Bank Centre in London. Museum director Rudi Fusch continued to champion his work, curating a retrospective on his works in 1993 at the Stedelijk Museum in Amsterdam entitled A Roomful of Hungry Looks. His work was also frequently curated by Hans Ulrich Obrist, who had met the artist in 1987. He was the subject of a retrospective exhibition at the Institute of Contemporary Arts in London in 2014.

Currently, his artwork is exhibited at Tate Modern in London as well as the Stedelijk Museum in Amsterdam. Other artwork is owned by the Arts Council Collection.

Death 
David Robilliard was diagnosed as HIV positive in 1988. He took to introducing himself as "David Robilliaids" after that point. He died within the year. Gilbert & George wrote a commemorative text on David Robilliard, "Our David", dated 7 July 1990: "David Robilliard was the sweetest, kindest, most infuriating, artistic, foul-mouthed, witty, sexy charming, handsome , thoughtful, unhappy, loving and friendly person we ever met. Over the nine years of our friendship David came closer to us than any other person. He will live forever in our hearts and minds. Starting with pockets filled with disorganised writings and sketches, he went on to produce highly original poetry, drawings and paintings. His truthfulness, sadness, desperation and love of people gave his work a brilliance and beauty that stands out a mile. Not a day passes without our thinking of David. His works live on for us all as a spiritual, cultural force and a great lesson in human love."

Exhibitions
 David Robilliard Solo Show, James Birch Fine Art, London, 1985
 The British Art Show 1990, Southbank Centre, London, 1990
 A roomful of hungry looks, Stedelijk Museum, Amsterdam, 1993
 The yes no quality of dreams, Institute of Contemporary Arts, London, 2014

Publications
Inevitable (London, 1984). 
Swallowing Helmets (Eindhoven, 1987). 
A Box of Poems (Birch & Conran, London 1987)

References

1952 births
1988 deaths
British poets
British contemporary artists
Guernsey artists
Painters from London
Artist authors
British gay artists
AIDS-related deaths in England
20th-century British LGBT people